Karimganj Kabristan, or Karimganj Cemetery is a Muslim burial ground in Old Karimganj, Gaya, Bihar, India. Administered by Gaya Nagar Nigam and managed by the Karimganj Kabristan Committee, it shares proximity with New Karimganj and Aliganj neighborhoods and is bordered by the Gaya–Kiul railway line to the north. It made headlines in October 2021 for hosting the COVID-19 vaccination camps during the second wave of the pandemic.

References 

Cemeteries in India
Gaya, India
Bihar